The following is a list of the Mayors of Grand Forks, North Dakota.

Mayors

References

External links
Grand Forks "Office of the Mayor" official website

Grand Forks
Mayors of Grand Forks, North Dakota